Hays Creek Mill, also known as McClung's Mill, Patterson's Mill, and Steele's Mill, is a historic grist mill located near Brownsburg, Rockbridge County, Virginia. It dates to about 1819, and is a -story, rectangular wood-frame building on a limestone basement.  The building measures 35 feet by 45 feet and retains an iron overshot wheel measuring 15 feet in diameter and 5 feet thick.  Associated with the mill are the contributing miller's house, garage that once served as a corn crib, and cow barn.  The Hays Creek Mill remained in operation until 1957 in a number of capacities as a grist, saw, and fulling mill.

It was listed on the National Register of Historic Places in 1995.

References

Grinding mills on the National Register of Historic Places in Virginia
Federal architecture in Virginia
Industrial buildings completed in 1819
Buildings and structures in Rockbridge County, Virginia
National Register of Historic Places in Rockbridge County, Virginia
Grinding mills in Virginia
1819 establishments in Virginia